Alan Clark (born 5 March 1952) is an English musician who was the first keyboardist and co-producer of the rock band Dire Straits. In 2018, Clark was inducted into the Rock and Roll Hall of Fame as a significant member of Dire Straits.

Early years 
As a six-year-old child, Alan received piano lessons. From the age of nine years he taught himself. At the age of 13 and while still a pupil at Chester-le-Street Grammar School, he began to play Hammond organ in working men's clubs in the northeast of England, and thereafter forged a successful career in music which included playing with a reformed Geordie which featured Brian Johnson (who would later join AC/DC), playing and recording with a duo called Splinter who were signed to George Harrison's Dark Horse label, playing and recording with Gallagher & Lyle, and playing on a tour of major UK festivals with Lindisfarne.

Career 
Clark joined Dire Straits in 1980 and remained a major influence on the band's music until the band's eventual dissolution in 1995. He co-produced the band's final album, On Every Street.  

In 1983 he played on Bob Dylan's album Infidels and also on Dylan's following Empire Burlesque album. Clark also worked with Knopfler on some of his film soundtrack work, most notably Knopfler's most successful soundtrack on the film Local Hero, in which he also makes an appearance as a piano player. He has also worked with Mark's brother David on his solo albums.  Throughout his time with Dire Straits, he was also Tina Turner's musical director and played on/arranged her hit "Private Dancer", toured and recorded with Eric Clapton (Journeyman) as well as playing in the "Orchestra Nights" performances with the National Philharmonic Orchestra and Michael Kamen during Clapton's 24 Nights concerts at the Royal Albert Hall in 1990 and 1991. He co-wrote with Clapton the score for the movie Communion. 

Clark has also played and recorded with other artists including, among others:

 Jon Anderson
 Joan Armatrading
 The Bee Gees
 The Blessing
 Rory Block
 Jamie Catto
 Phil Collins
 Robert Cray
 Roger Daltrey 
 Bo Diddley 
 Dire Straits Legacy
 Escape Club
 Gallagher and Lyle 
 Geordie
 Al Green
 Buddy Guy
 George Harrison 
 Mary Hopkin 
 Mick Hucknall
 Billy Joel
 Elton John 
 Brian Johnson
 David Knopfler
 Mark Knopfler
 Lindisfarne
 Matt Monro 
 Jimmy Nail
 Pet Shop Boys
 Prefab Sprout 
 Gerry Rafferty
 Lou Reed
 Seal
 Shakin Stevens
 Sky
 Sly and Robbie 
 Dave Stewart 
 Rod Stewart 
 Van Morrison
 Robbie Williams
 Bruce Willis
 Westernhagen

In 2001 Clark composed the music for the long-running paranormal show Most Haunted. He has also composed music for TV shows and commercials.

In 2004 he performed the theme from Local Hero with Mark Knopfler at the opening of Alan Shearer's bar in Newcastle United football ground.

In 2005 he wrote, directed and scored a film, The Inspiration, to commemorate 25 years of the Great North Run, which was screened and performed live with the northern Philharmonic at Sage Gateshead.

In 2009, Clark reunited with Dire Straits band member John Illsley for a concert in San Vigilio, Italy, and with Illsley and Phil Palmer in 2010 at the XRoads club in Rome, playing a set of Dire Straits songs.

In 2011, he formed a band, the Straits, to play the music of Dire Straits at a charity show at the Albert Hall, which featured drummer Steve Ferrone from Tom Petty and the Heartbreakers, and Dire Straits' guitarist Phil Palmer. They went on to perform other successful shows as the Dire Straits Legacy, which included Dire Straits members Danny Cummings, Mel Collins, Jack Sonni, and producer/bass player Trevor Horn.

He is a member of a band called LEGACY, which features himself, Phil Palmer, Steve Ferrone, Trevor Horn, Danny Cummings, Mel Collins, Primi de Biasse and Marco Caviglia, and in 2017 he wrote and produced, with Phil Palmer, an album for LEGACY called Three Chord Trick.

In 2017 he recorded in Real World studios with Italian artist Pacifico.

He is a member of Trevor Horn's band and works/records with Horn on other projects.

In 2019 he co-produced with Trevor Horn and Phil Palmer, Renato Zero's hugely successful record Zero Il Folle and played on several major records including Trevor Horn Reimagines the Eighties and Rod Stewart's You're In My Heart.

In June 2019, he played a solo piano concert at the Milan Piano Festival.

In 2020, he co-wrote and co-produced several tracks on Renato Zero's hugely successful Zerosettanta album.

In Sept 2021, he released his solo piano record Backstory.

Collaborations 
  Lonesome No More - Gallagher and Lyle
  Love over Gold - Dire Straits
  Alchemy - Dire Straits
  Twisting by the Pool - Dire Straits
  Brothers in Arms - Dire Straits
  On the Night - Dire Straits
  On every Street - Dire Straits
 Sleepwalking - Gerry Rafferty (1982)
 Infidels - Bob Dylan (1983)
 Private Dancer - Tina Turner (1984)
 Empire Burlesque - Bob Dylan (1985)
 Down in the Groove - Bob Dylan (1988)
  Wild Wild West - Escape Club
 North and South - Gerry Rafferty (1988)
 The Shouting Stage - Joan Armatrading (1988)
 Journeyman - Eric Clapton (1989)
 Still Water - Bee Gees
 Big River - Jimmy Nail (1995)
 Crocodile Shoes II - Jimmy Nail (1996)
 Andromeda Heights - Prefab Sprout (1997)
 Life Goes On - Gerry Rafferty (2009)
  Three Chord Trick - Legacy
  Zero il Folle - Renato Zero 2019
  Zerosettanta - Renato Zero 2020
  You're in my Heart - Rod Stewart
  Rest in Blue - Gerry Rafferty 2021
  Backstory - Alan Clark 2021
  I changed Many Houses - Tiromancio 2021

References

External links
Official Website
The Hull Story information from www.lindisfarne.com

1952 births
Living people
20th-century British pianists
21st-century British pianists
British male pianists
Dire Straits members
English rock keyboardists
English rock pianists
Musicians from County Durham